Red Oak is an unincorporated community in Lawrence County, in the U.S. state of Missouri.

History
A post office called Redoak was established in 1877, and remained in operation until 1922. The community took its name from Red Oak Township.

References

Unincorporated communities in Lawrence County, Missouri
Unincorporated communities in Missouri